Iva Serdar (born 26 August 1982) is a Croatian female professional basketball player. She is 6ft 5in tall.

External links
Profile at eurobasket.com

1982 births
Living people
Basketball players from Rijeka
Croatian women's basketball players
Centers (basketball)
Mediterranean Games medalists in basketball
Mediterranean Games silver medalists for Croatia
Competitors at the 2005 Mediterranean Games
21st-century Croatian women